Separation of church and state is one of the primary theological distinctions of the Baptist tradition.

History
Originally, Baptists supported separation of church and state in England and America.  Some important Baptist figures in the struggle were John Smyth, Thomas Helwys, Edward Wightman, Leonard Busher, Roger Williams (who was a Baptist for a short period but became a "Seeker"), John Clarke, Isaac Backus, and John Leland.

English Baptists
In 1612 John Smyth wrote, "the magistrate is not by virtue of his office to meddle with religion, or matters of conscience". That same year, Thomas Helwys wrote that the King of England could "command what of man he will, and we are to obey it," but, concerning the church—"with this Kingdom, our lord the King hath nothing to do." In 1614, Leonard Busher wrote what is believed to be the earliest Baptist treatise dealing exclusively with the subject of religious liberty.

American Baptists

The Danbury Baptist Association of Danbury, Connecticut sent a letter, dated October 7, 1801, to the newly elected President Thomas Jefferson, expressing concern over the lack in their state constitution of explicit protection of religious liberty, and against a government establishment of religion.

In their letter to the President, the Danbury Baptists affirmed that "Our Sentiments are uniformly on the side of Religious Liberty":

  
As a religious minority in Connecticut, the Danbury Baptists were concerned that a religious majority might "reproach their chief Magistrate... because he will not, dare not assume the prerogatives of Jehovah and make Laws to govern the Kingdom of Christ," thus establishing a state religion at the cost of the liberties of religious minorities.

"Make no law"
Thomas Jefferson's response, dated January 1, 1802, concurs with the Danbury Baptists' views on religious liberty, and the accompanying separation of civil government from concerns of religious doctrine and practice.

This doctrine, known as the "wall of separation" or "strict separationism," would later become highly influential in 20th century Supreme Court understandings of the relationship between church and state. The phrase "separation of church and state" does not appear in the United States Constitution, despite its wide use and origin from a founding father. The relevance of this reply is a subject of heated debate, with scholars such as Robert Boston emphasizing its importance, and others such as Mark David Hall arguing that the letter was a historical outlier.

Contemporary Baptist views in America
In the U.S. today, a group of Baptists believe the United States was formed as a Christian nation by the Founding Fathers. There is neither a unifying nor a codified doctrinal position among American Baptists.  Interpretations of the meaning of "separation of church and state" vary among different Baptist affiliations.

However, many Baptists in the United States still believe in the wall of separation and support maintaining it. For example, fifteen Baptist organizations, representing collectively over ten million Baptists in America, collaborate with one another to protect religious liberty and the separation of church and state through their funding of the Baptist Joint Committee for Religious Liberty.  Freedom of conscience is a historic Baptist distinctive, and many Baptists continue to believe the best course for obtaining and securing freedom of conscience is through the separation of church and state.

See also

Baptists
 East Waynesville Baptist Church
Separation of church and state
Soul competency

References

Baptist Christianity
Separation of church and state

External links
Letter to the Danbury Baptists on Wikisource